El Chapulín Colorado (English: The Red Grasshopper) is a Mexican television comedy series that ran from 1973 to 1979 and parodied superhero shows. It was created by Roberto Gómez Bolaños (Chespirito), who also played the main character. It was first aired by Televisa in 1973 in Mexico, and then was aired across Latin America and Spain until 1981, alongside El Chavo del Ocho, which shared the same cast of actors. Both shows have endured in re-runs and have won back some of their popularity in several countries such as Brazil, Colombia or Peru. Although the series has a regular cast, all actors but Gómez Bolaños play different characters each episode, and it is therefore described as an anthology series.

Overview

"Chapulín Colorado" translates literally in English as "The Red Grasshopper" or "The Cherry Cricket"  (the word chapulín is of Nahuatl origin and applies to a Mexican species of grasshopper, while colorado means "red".). The show embodies many aspects of Latin and Mexican culture while making a critique on the unrealistic image of superheroes. In each episode, people recognized Chapulín wherever he appeared (one episode took place on the planet Venus), believing him to be a great superhero. Recognition caused him to boast, only to stumble and fall right away, proving himself to be puny and timid, and disappointing his fans. Despite this, Chapulín tried his best to help, and all his adventures ended well (though sometimes by sheer good luck or outside help.)

Parodying Superman's "Faster than a speeding bullet, more powerful than a locomotive" introduction, Chapulín was introduced as follows in the show's opening, reinforcing the idea of a barely powered hero:

Más ágil que una tortuga, más fuerte que un ratón, más noble que una lechuga, su escudo es un corazón... ¡Es el Chapulín Colorado!
 (More agile than a turtle, stronger than a mouse, nobler than a lettuce, his shield is a heart... He's the Cherry Cricket!)
Más veloz que una montaña, Más ágil que un refrigerador, Más astuto que un aguacate, ¿y quién es?, Es……, ¿Una paleta helada, ¿Un clavel?, ¿Un cuaderno cuadriculado?, ¡No!, Es…., ¡El Chapulín Colorado!
 (Faster than a mountain, More agile than a refrigerator, smarter than an avocado and who is he?, He’s……, A popsicle?, A carnation?, A squared notebook?, No!, He’s…., The Cherry Cricket!

Recurrent characters besides the protagonist

 Heroes 
 Súper Sam (Super Sam): (1973–1978; 1981) Played by Ramón Valdés.
He is a superhero that hails from somewhere in the U.S. (most probably its southernmost regions) whose appearance is very similar to that of Uncle Sam (including the famous top hat with the colors of the U.S.), but his suit is similar to Superman's. Half of the things Súper Sam says are in English, considering his inadequate skills with Spanish (he is known for having to carry an English-Spanish dictionary in his pocket whenever he needs to save someone in Mexico). Súper Sam's primary weapon is a bag full of dollars that he says were "few, but very powerful"; it is usually used to beat on the head of the wrongdoers or Chapulín, as both don't get along very well. Every time he uses his weapon, the ringing of a cash register chimes in the show's audio. His catchphrase is "Time is Money, oh yeah!" and when present, most people say that "they don't want imported superheroes", much to Súper Sam's annoyance. According to Florinda Meza's character, Super Sam is "just like Chapulín, but with a bank account."

 Villains 

 The Mob 
 Tripaseca (Dry-Gut): (1975–1979) Played by Ramón Valdés. He is one of the most frequently recurring villains on the show. He is a very dangerous gangster who is part of a mafia gang composed of Cuajináis, Chory, Botija and Minina. He is considered the archenemy of Chapulín, always scheming along with the rest of his gang to kill the hero to commit all the robberies he wants. In an episode in which he pretends to be dead to fool the local police force, Chapulín states that he had known Tripaseca since the two of them were children.
 Cuajináis (Almost-Nothing): (1973–1978) Played by Carlos Villagrán. He is a deadly gangster characterized by the huge scar on his right cheek. Although he is an ally of Tripaseca, sometimes he attempts to score certain crimes on his own.
 Chory (the word has double meaning; it is the Spanish abbreviation of the word "chorizo", or Spanish sausage, and is also based on the English word shorty, a sarcastic reference on Rubén Aguirre's height of 1.96m or 6'5"): (1973–1992) Played by Rubén Aguirre. He is a vicious mobster characterized by his high stature and coldness. El Shory often gives trouble to Chapulín in combat because of his superior strength and endurance. In some chapters, this character is nicknamed "El Nene (The Kid)".
 Minina (Pussycat):(1975-1979) Played by Florinda Meza. A woman who accompanies the mafia in their schemes and is characterized by constant smoking and her low intellectual capacity.
 Pocas Trancas (Few-Lock): Interpreted by Rubén Aguirre. He is a madman who escaped from the asylum. People believe that Pocas Trancas was deaf but a detective clarified that he couldn't speak because he didn't wash his tongue and that he couldn't listen because he didn't wash his ears. What he lacked in intelligence he made up for in raw strength, according to the same detective. Súper Sam and Chapulín usually have to team up to fight him.

 The Gunmen 
 Rascabuches (Tear-Maw):(1973-1979; 1981) Played by Ramón Valdés. He is a fiery gunslinger whose mere presence makes all the inhabitants of any village flee in terror. He faced Chapulín many times and was always defeated by him (although once he was trapped by a giant mousetrap that had a bag of money as bait). The Rascabuches has a young daughter named Rosa.
 Matonsísimo Kid (Bullymost Kid): (1975–1981) Interpreted by Carlos Villagrán or Rubén Aguirre. A dangerous gunman who constantly plagues small towns of the old American West, he is an ally of Rascabuches and Rosa la Rumorosa. Although claimed to be the fastest gunman of the Old West, Chapulín always managed to overcome him.
 Rosa la Rumorosa (Rose the Rumor Girl):(1973-1981) Performed by Florinda Meza. She is the only daughter of Rascabuches, one of the most feared gunmen of the Old West. Despite being an accomplice to her father, she sometimes laments the fact that no one proposes marriage to her because of the notoriety of her father.

 The Pirates 
 Alma Negra (Black Soul):(1975-1978; 1981) Played by Ramón Valdés. He is the captain of the pirates, and as he said, the chief of all the pirates of the seven seas. Captain Alma Negra is evil but sometimes clumsy as well (once being hurt with his own dagger while trying to intimidate el Chapulín). He is characterized by his malevolent laughter and his tendency to endanger the life of his own crew and of Chapulín or any girl that doesn't want to marry him. According to himself, he killed the Dead Sea and therefore there are no longer seven seas, only six. At some point, he died but his ghost continued to curse the seas.
 Matalote (Slaughter):(1975-1978) Interpreted by Rubén Aguirre. He is Alma Negra's right-hand man, the tallest of the pirates, and surely the most cruel after Alma Negra. El Matalote is known for being quite strong and ruthless.
 Sabandija (Gecko/Louse):(1975-1978) Played by Carlos Villagrán. He is a clumsy pirate that has a left wooden leg and a right glass eye, the former lost in one of the many battles fought under Alma Negra's command and the latter lost after peeking through a keyhole. He and Panza Loca are the only ones in the crew who rebel against the master pirate alongside Chapulín.
 Panza Loca (Crazy Belly): Played by Edgar Vivar. He is the fattest of the pirates, has a little intimidating voice and apparently was not a very good pirate. He is as cowardly as Sabandija and often suffers through life-threatening situations because of the whims of Captain Alma Negra.

Production
Concept
According to Chespirito, the difference between Chapulín and standard heroes:

Pioneer in visual effects
With Chapulín, Chespirito and along his production team made extensive use of the chroma key device and bluescreen to produce visual effects which made the adventures of this superhero more interesting. Though somewhat unrefined by modern standards, the show achieved surprising effects like floating in the air or flying, performing impossible acrobatics, fighting against Martians, strange creatures, witches and various monsters, and, most often, to get the physical reduction effect thanks to his famous "pastillas de chiquitolina", which Chapulín frequently used to pass under doors, reach dangerous areas without attracting attention, or solve problems.

This innovation, which was already known in Mexican television but not widely used, gave Chapulín the distinction of being virtually the only adventure-comedy broadcast in Mexico.

Related media
Animated series

An animated series based on the show premiered in April 2015, made by Ánima Estudios.

Animated film
In May 2017, Roberto Gomez Fernandez revealed that an animated film adaptation of El Chapulin Colorado is in development. On 6 October 2019, it was reported that Gomez Fernandez had begun working on the script. Later that month, Gomez Fernandez revealed that production on the film has begun. He also said that the film will take place in a shared universe featuring characters created by Chespirito.

Live-action film
In December 2020, Gomez Fernandez revealed that a live-action film based on the character is being produced in parallel to the animated film. The idea for a live-action feature film was conceived during development on the animated film. Althrougth no actor has been cast on the title role, Gomez Fernandez acknowledged that the studio has certain actors in consideration.

Comics
El Chapulín Colorado comics were sold in Mexico during the program's broadcasting years from 1974 until 1982. These comics have also been seen occasionally appearing in some episodes of El Chavo (where El Chapulín Colorado is considered a fictional character on the show) usually being read by the characters. The comics were sold weekly and sold an estimated total of more than 400 issues.

In the early 1990s with the high popularity of the products of the Chespirito characters in Brazil, two series of children's comics were made in partnership with the Editora Globo, with a new art style different from Mexican comics. These comics were Chaves & Chapolim (1990–1993) and Chapolim & Chaves (1991–1992), both comics features stories both with El Chavo and El Chapulín Colorado.

In May 2017, along with the announcement of a film, Gómez Fernández revealed that a comic series based on the character is in development.

Reception
PopularityChapulín has enjoyed popularity all over Latin America, the United States, Spain, Portugal and other countries, albeit somewhat less than its sister production of El Chavo. Like El Chavo, it is still shown in reruns in various countries. The cast of Chapulín was the same as that of El Chavo, although only actors Florinda Meza, Carlos Villagrán and Ramón Valdés were usually in every episode; however, the characters usually were different. Some of the regular (albeit infrequent) characters who appeared, usually Chapulín foes, were El Tripaseca (Valdés) and El Cuajinais' (Villagrán), a pair of Mafiosi who liked to make heists, as well as concurrent superhero Super Sam (played by Valdés too; see below). One-off villains, mostly those played by Valdés, like Wild West outlaw El Rascabuche, are also fondly remembered by fans.

Shorter Chapulín adventures were preceded by a skit, usually featuring Chespirito's other characters, like Dr. Chapatín, a tactless, impatient old physician, or El Chómpiras, an incompetent thief in the skit called Los Caquitos, along with El Peterete, played by Ramón Valdés. Chompiras and his new partner in crime, El Botija, played by Edgar Vivar, came to dominate the later years of Chespirito, an hour-long showcase featuring all the characters of the show.

The physical diversity of Chespirito actors permitted the richness of characters in the adventures, each week a new one. Chapulín was a hero of undetermined geographic and temporal location: his adventures could unfold in the American Old West, in ancient China, in London, in the Swiss Alps, during the Spanish Inquisition, in pirate ships, in Nazi Germany (an episode in which Chespirito played a double role as Chapulín and as Adolf Hitler himself, in the style of Charles Chaplin's The Great Dictator) or outer space, and his enemies range from the Yeti to Egyptian mummies, including his interaction, in some occasions, with literary characters such as Romeo and Juliet ("Juleo y Rumieta", or literally "Juleo and Rumiet").El Chapulín Colorado is also extremely popular in Brazil. The company, Tec Toy, responsible for distributing the Sega consoles in Brazil, published a video game for the Sega Master System called Chapolim x Drácula: Um duelo assustador (Chapulín vs. Dracula: A Frightening Duel). It was a localization of another existing SMS title, Ghost House, with the hero's graphics changed to Chapulín's.

LegacyThe Simpsons creator Matt Groening has said that he created the Bumblebee Man character after watching El Chapulín Colorado in a motel on the United States–Mexico border.

The character made a cameo on Action Comics No. 820 (December 2004), published by DC Comics.

The Marvel Comics superheroine Red Locust, a member of the newest incarnation of the Champions, was created as an homage to El Chapulín Colorado.

On the manga and anime series One Punch Man, a superhero called "Smile Man" physically resembles El Chapulín Colorado, while it also resembles classic Japanese character Anpanman. The character wears almost the same yellow and red suit as El Chapulín, using a big red and yellow hammer as well. However, there're a few noticeable differences, such as the lack of antennae on the head, a big smile face instead of a heart shield on his chest (just like Anpanman) and the use of a mask. While it is yet to be confirmed if the character is a parody or a tribute of El Chapulín Colorado, several news websites (especially from Latin America) noticed the physical similarities. The official Spanish Twitter account of the series even acknowledged the similarities, using one of El Chapulín's quotes along a screenshot showing Smile Man.

El Chapulín Colorado appears in one of the episodes of season 5 of Monica Toy (animated spin-off of Monica's Gang).

To celebrate the 91st anniversary of Chespirito's birth date and the 50th anniversary of the character's creation, on 21 February 2020, the videogame FIFA 20 added a free DLC based on El Chapulín Colorado. The DLC specifically added a new yellow and red uniform based on the character for the Ultimate Team game mode, which includes the heart shield on the uniform's shirt.

On October 29, 2021, it was announced that El Chapulín Colorado would become a playable character in the popular video game Fortnite, becoming available to the public as of November 2, 2021. Additionally, there are two sets of 5 outfits made with common Fortnite characters wearing the Chapulín Colorado outfit.

On July 9, 2022, a skin based on El Chapulín Colorado was added to Epic Games' Fall Guys, which was available until July 13. Later that year on October 11, a Chapulín Colorado-themed vehicle and the character's imagery were added to sister game Rocket League'', which were available until October 17.

Fine Art 
El Chapulín Colorado was one of the subjects incorporated by photographer Dulce Pinzon in her photographic series titled "The Real Stories of the Superheroes." In this series, Pinzon dressed mostly Mexican immigrants as various superheroes, but performing their normal, daily work in construction, childcare, waitressing, window cleaning, etc., and then photographed them. The series included super heroes such as Batman, Superman, Spider-Man, as well as El Chapulin Colorado. This photographic series was declared as part of the National Legacy of Mexico in 2020.

References

External links

A profile of El Chapulín Colorado
About the movie of El Chapulín Colorado
CHAPULIN IN SPACE Apple iPad, iPhone and iPod Touch APP with music.

Las Estrellas original programming
1970s satirical television series
1970s Mexican television series
1973 Mexican television series debuts
1979 Mexican television series endings
Superhero comedy television series
Comic science fiction television series
Fictional grasshoppers
Parody superheroes
Television series about size change
Mexican television sitcoms
Chespirito characters